The 2021 NCAA Division I men's soccer tournament was the 63rd edition of the NCAA Division I men's soccer tournament, a postseason tournament that determined the national champion of the 2021 NCAA Division I men's soccer season. The College Cup, the semifinals and finals of the tournament, were played on December 10 and December 12 in Cary, North Carolina.

Qualification 
Pending the state of the COVID-19 pandemic, 48 teams have been selected to participate.  There were 23 automatic bids: the 20 conference tournament champions and to the regular season winners of the Ivy League, Pac-12 Conference, and West Coast Conference, which do not have tournaments.  The remaining 25 berths are determined through an at-large process based upon the Ratings Percentage Index (RPI) of teams that did not automatically qualify.

The NCAA Selection Committee also named the top sixteen seeds for the tournament, with those teams receiving an automatic bye into the second round of the tournament. The remaining 32 teams play in a single-elimination match in the first round of the tournament for the right to play a seeded team in the second round.

Qualified teams

Seeded teams

Bracket 
The bracket was announced on Monday, November 15, 2021. First round games will be played on November 18 at campus sites.

Regional 1 
Host Institution*

Regional 2 

Host Institution*

Regional 3 

Host Institution*

Regional 4 

Host Institution*

2021 College Cup

Results

First round

Second round

Third round

Quarterfinals

College Cup Semifinals

College Cup Final

Records by conference 

The R32, S16, E8, F4, CG, and NC columns indicate how many teams from each conference were in the Round of 32 (second round), Round of 16 (third round), Quarterfinals (Elite Eight), Semi-finals (Final Four), Championship Game, and National Champion, respectively.
The following conferences failed to place a team into the round of 32: ASUN, Big South, Big West, Horizon, Ivy League, MAAC, MVC, Patriot, SoCon, WAC. The conference's records have been consolidated in the other row.

Statistics

Goalscorers

Honors

College Cup All-Tournament team

See also 
 2021 NCAA Division I Women's Soccer Tournament

References 

Tournament
NCAA Division I Men's Soccer Tournament seasons
NCAA Division I Men's Soccer
NCAA Division I men's soccer tournament
NCAA Division I men's soccer tournament